Buninga Island is an inhabited island in Shefa Province of Vanuatu in the Pacific Ocean. The island is a part of Shepherd Islands archipelago.

Geography
Buninga Island lies 2 km south-west of Tongariki Island. The island is 1.5 km in diameter. The estimated terrain elevation above the sea level is some 209 metres.

Population
As of 2015, the official local population was 112 people in 23 households.

References

Islands of Vanuatu
Shefa Province